The Bitlis uprising was a Kurdish uprising in the Ottoman Empire in early 1914. It was supported by the Russian Empire. It was fought concurrently with an unrelated Kurdish uprising in Barzan in the Mosul Vilayet, which was also supported by Russia. Later Kurdish nationalist historiography portrayed the uprising as part of a Kurdish nationalist struggle, but its actual causes laid in opposition to conscription and taxation. The uprising began in early March, with a skirmish between Kurdish fighters and Ottoman gendarmes, where the latter was forced to retreat. The Kurds subsequently laid siege to the city of Bitlis, and captured the city on 2 April. Ottoman forces were then dispatched from Muş and Van and suppressed the uprising. After the defeat of the uprising on 4 April, one of the rebel leaders, Molla Selim, successfully sought asylum in Russia.

References 
Conflicts in 1914
1914 in the Ottoman Empire
Kurdish–Turkish conflict
Wars involving the Ottoman Empire

External links